Joseph Jacob may refer to:

Joseph Jacob (cellist), Belgian musician
Joe Jacob, Irish politician

See also
Jacob Joseph (disambiguation)
Joseph Jacobs (disambiguation)